The following elections occurred in the year 1933.

Africa
 1933 South African general election
 1933 Southern Rhodesian general election

Australia
 1933 South Australian state election
 1933 Western Australian state election

Europe
 1933 Dutch general election
 1933 Finnish parliamentary election
 1933 Greek legislative election
 1933 Icelandic prohibition referendum
 1933 Irish general election
 1933 Norwegian parliamentary election
 1933 Portuguese constitutional referendum

Germany
 November 1933 German election
 1933 German referendum
 March 1933 German federal election

Spain
 1933 Spanish general election

United Kingdom
 1933 Altrincham by-election
 1933 Fulham East by-election
 1933 Kilmarnock by-election
 1933 Liverpool Exchange by-election
 1933 Normanton by-election
 1933 Northern Ireland general election
 1933 Rhondda East by-election

North America

Canada
 1933 British Columbia general election
 1933 Edmonton municipal election
 1933 Nova Scotia general election
 1933 Ottawa municipal election
 1933 Toronto municipal election

United States

Pennsylvania
 1933 Pittsburgh mayoral election

Australia
 1933 South Australian state election
 1933 Western Australian state election

See also
 :Category:1933 elections

1933
Elections